Pierrefonds-Senneville is a former Montreal borough in the West Island area of Montreal, Quebec.

It was formed by forced merger on January 1, 2002. After Senneville voted on June 20, 2004 to demerge from Montreal and returned to being an independent municipality on January 1, 2006, the Pierrefonds sector was merged with Roxboro to create the borough of Pierrefonds-Roxboro.

See also
 List of former boroughs
 Montreal Merger
 Municipal reorganization in Quebec

Pierrefonds-Roxboro
Former Montreal boroughs
Populated places established in 2002
2006 disestablishments in Quebec
2002 establishments in Quebec

fr:Pierrefonds-Senneville